Staadt Creek is a stream in the U.S. state of South Dakota.

Staadt Creek has the name of George Staadt, a pioneer hunter.

See also
List of rivers of South Dakota

References

Rivers of Harding County, South Dakota
Rivers of South Dakota